Ñuble is a transfer station between the Line 5 and Line 6 of the Santiago Metro. The station has street-level platforms with an underground ticket hall, which is accessed from the south sidewalk of the underpass under the station, which carries Carlos Dittborn Avenue. That street originates half-block west of the station as the continuation of Ñuble Street, which gives its name to the station. The Line 5 station was opened on 5 April 1997 as part of the inaugural section of the line, from Baquedano to Bellavista de La Florida. The Line 6 station was opened on 2 November 2017 as part of the inaugural section of the line, between Cerrillos and Los Leones.

Its copper-clad roof is supported by girder arches, which have circular holes.

References

Santiago Metro stations
Railway stations opened in 1997
Santiago Metro Line 5
Santiago Metro Line 6